Eléonore Denuelle (13 September 1787 – 30 January 1868) was a mistress of Emperor Napoleon I of France and the mother of his son Charles, Count Léon.

She was born Louise Catherine Eléonore Denuelle de la Plaigne into a middle-class family, by reports of the day she was pretty and witty, and was married at the age of 18 to a former army captain, Jean-François Revel-Honoré. Her husband was arrested for fraud three months into the marriage, and sentenced to two years in prison. On 29 April 1806, the couple were granted a divorce.

Shortly afterward she became a mistress to the Emperor Napoleon, an arrangement set up by his sister Caroline Bonaparte, and in less than a year their illegitimate son, Count Léon, was born. He was Napoleon's first illegitimate child, and proof that Napoleon was capable of producing an heir, establishing that his wife Joséphine de Beauharnais was infertile. As a result, he divorced Joséphine and married Marie Louise of Austria.

In 1808, Napoleon arranged a marriage for her to a young lieutenant, Pierre-Philippe Augier of Sauzay, in order to end the royal affair. She was paid a hefty dowry by the emperor, and the newly married couple departed for Spain. Augier was listed as missing in action on 28 November 1812 during Napoleon's Russian Campaign. Newly widowed, she married Count Charles-Emile-Auguste-Louis de Luxbourg in 1814. She remained with her third husband until his death 35 years later.

Sources

Translations

Mistresses of Napoleon
1787 births
1868 deaths
Burials at Père Lachaise Cemetery